The Salmon River is a river in the north of Vancouver Island in British Columbia, Canada. Its headwaters lie in Strathcona Park. It flows northwest, through the Sayward Valley into Kelsey Bay next to the village of Sayward before finally entering Johnstone Strait. The river supports steelhead and several species of Pacific salmon.

References

External links

Rivers of Vancouver Island
Northern Vancouver Island